All at Sea is a 1940 British comedy film directed by Herbert Smith and starring Sandy Powell, Kay Walsh and John Warwick.

It was made at Beaconsfield Studios. The film's sets were designed by the art director Philip Bawcombe.

Plot
On his way to deliver a message, bumbling chemical factory worker Sandy (Sandy Powell) accidentally enlists in the navy. There he stumbles on spies, but somehow manages to save the day.

Cast
 Sandy Powell as Sandy Skipton 
 Kay Walsh as Diana  
 John Warwick as Brown  
 Gus McNaughton as Nobby  
 George Merritt as Bull  
 Leslie Perrins as Williams  
 Franklin Dyall as Dr. Stolk  
 Robert Rendel as Sir Herbert  
 Aubrey Mallalieu as Prof. Myles

References

Bibliography
 Wood, Linda. British Films, 1927-1939. British Film Institute, 1986.

External links

1940 films
1940 comedy films
British comedy films
Films directed by Herbert Smith
Films shot at Beaconsfield Studios
British black-and-white films
British Lion Films films
Military humor in film
World War II films made in wartime
1940s English-language films